Fencing events have been contested at every Universiade since 1959 Summer Universiade in Turin. After not being included in 1975.

Events

Men

Women

Medal table
Last updated after the 2019 Summer Universiade

References 
Sports123

 
Sports at the Summer Universiade
Universiade